Gymboree Group, Inc. is a wholly owned subsidiary of The Children's Place.

History
Gymboree was founded by Joan Barnes in 1976.

Retail stores
In 1986, the company opened a chain of clothing stores named Gymboree. Gymboree stores offered coordinating children's clothing. The sizes ranged from newborn to size ten. As of January 2019, it operated 380 Gymboree stores, 154 Gymboree outlets, 147 Janie & Jack stores, 253 Crazy 8 stores, and 11 Crazy 8 outlets in the U.S. and Canada.

Crazy 8 was started in August 2007. It featured lower-priced clothing and was Gymboree's direct competitor for The Children's Place and Old Navy.

In 2010, Bain Capital acquired the company for US$1.8 billion.

In June 2017, Gymboree announced it was filing for Chapter 11 bankruptcy protection.  As part of the debt management process, it said it would close 375 of its 1,300 stores.  In September 2017, the company emerged from bankruptcy. In 2017, the company closed 350 of its 1,281 stores.

In November 2018, it was reported that Gymboree would file for bankruptcy for the second time in 14 months, and as a result, Gymboree announced plans to discontinue the Crazy 8 brand and close all Crazy 8 stores after the holiday season.

On January 17, 2019, Gymboree filed for Chapter 11 bankruptcy protection, closing all Gymboree, Gymboree Outlet, and Crazy 8 stores as a result. The company sold its Janie & Jack stores to Gap, Inc.

Play & Music Centers

In July 2016, The Gymboree Corporation sold the Gymboree Play & Music business to Zeavion Holding, a private company with a focus on the education and entertainment sectors. Gymboree Play & Music is now completely separate from the Gymboree Corporation and is operating parent-child play classes for ages 0–5. Play & Music operates in over 40 countries and has more than 733 centers internationally. Gymboree Play and Music centers are not affected by the Gymboree stores closing.

Relaunch
On June 24, 2019, the Gymboree assets were sold to The Children's Place, who announced that Gymboree would relaunch as an online retailer and would also feature a store-within-a-store concept at The Children's Place stores. It was announced on January 30, 2020, that The Children's Place would relaunch Gymboree in February that year, featuring an "early access" program that would allow early access to the first 10,000 customers who register a spot.

Lawsuits
In November 2005, Gymboree settled a lawsuit relating to overtime compensation in Riverside, California for $2.3 million. The lawsuit alleged that Gymboree did not pay mandatory overtime or provide required meal breaks.

References

External links

 Official website

Franchises
American companies established in 1976
Clothing companies established in 1976
Retail companies established in 1976
American companies disestablished in 2019
Clothing companies disestablished in 2019
Retail companies disestablished in 2019
American companies established in 2020
Retail companies established in 2020
2010 mergers and acquisitions
Early childhood education
Early childhood education in the United States
Clothing retailers of the United States
Bain Capital companies
Companies that filed for Chapter 11 bankruptcy in 2017
Companies that filed for Chapter 11 bankruptcy in 2019
Medical and health organizations based in California
1976 establishments in California
2019 disestablishments in California
Re-established companies